Evelyn Delerme Camacho is a Puerto Rican politician and former mayor of Vieques. Delerme is affiliated with the New Progressive Party (PNP) and served as mayor from 2009 to 2013.

References

Living people
Mayors of places in Puerto Rico
New Progressive Party (Puerto Rico) politicians
People from Vieques, Puerto Rico
21st-century Puerto Rican women politicians
21st-century Puerto Rican politicians
Women mayors of places in Puerto Rico
Year of birth missing (living people)